Our Madagascar is a political party in Madagascar. The party's candidate Elia Ravelomanantsoa won 2.56% in the December 2006 presidential election.  Since the 23 September 2007 National Assembly elections it is no longer represented in parliament

References

Political parties in Madagascar